Susanne Gynning-Ödlund (born May 20, 1950) is a Swedish curler.

Teams

References

External links
 

Living people
1950 births
Swedish female curlers
Swedish curling champions